Clifford Argue (December 2, 1901 – April 4, 1970) was an American athlete. He competed in the men's pentathlon at the 1924 Summer Olympics.

References

External links
 

1901 births
1970 deaths
Athletes (track and field) at the 1924 Summer Olympics
American pentathletes
Olympic track and field athletes of the United States
People from Port Hueneme, California
20th-century American people